Worksop railway station is a Grade II listed railway station which serves the town of Worksop in Nottinghamshire, England.

History

The station was designed by Weightman & Hadfield, Sheffield in the Jacobean style, and built by James Drabble, Carlton in Lindrick. It was opened on 7 July 1849 by the Sheffield and Lincolnshire Junction Railway, part of the Manchester, Sheffield and Lincolnshire Railway. It was extended and further buildings added in 1900.

The station buildings on each side are still in use - operator Northern runs the booking office on platform 1, Network Rail has office accommodation on platform 1 and the remaining rooms are utilised as private commercial premises, Platform 2 houses the Railway Cafe.

Worksop Power signal box (PSB), which was opened in 1998, is located at the western end of the station on the Retford-bound platform, and there are a number of goods loops and sidings close by that are used for stabling and reversing/recessing coal trains serving the nearby power stations at West Burton and Cottam.  Platform 2 has a turnback facility provided, so that terminating trains from the west and south can terminate and start back from there without having to change lines and use the level crossing at the eastern end.

Facilities
The station is staffed part-time (ticket office open Monday - Friday 07:00 - 17:00, Saturday 07:00 - 13:30, closed Sundays); self-service ticket machines are also provided for use outside these times and for collecting advance-purchase tickets. Refreshment facilities are available via a cafe on platform 2, a public house on platform 1 and from vending machines on both sides. Canopies provide covered waiting areas on both platforms – these are also fully accessible for disabled passengers. Train running information is offered via automatic announcements, timetable posters and digital display screens.

The station went through authentic restoration works in early to mid 2018 with a new authentic colour scheme which was used when the station first opened in the 19th century.

Services 
Services at Worksop are operated by Northern Trains and East Midlands Railway.

The typical off-peak service in trains per hour is:
 1 tph to  via 
 1 tph to  via 
 1 tph to 

There are no Sunday services to Nottingham.

See also
Listed buildings in Worksop

References

External links

Railway stations in Nottinghamshire
DfT Category E stations
Former Great Central Railway stations
Railway stations in Great Britain opened in 1849
Railway stations served by East Midlands Railway
Northern franchise railway stations
Worksop
1849 establishments in England
Grade II listed buildings in Nottinghamshire
Grade II listed railway stations